The women's cycling team pursuit at the 2019 European Games was held at the Minsk Velodrome on 27 and 28 June 2019.

Results

Qualifying

First round
First round heats were held as follows:
Heat 1: 7th fastest alone
Heat 2: 5th v 6th fastest
Heat 3: 2nd v 3rd fastest
Heat 4: 1st v 4th fastest

The winners of heats 3 and 4 proceeded to the gold medal race. The remaining five teams were ranked on time, from which the top two proceeded to the bronze medal race.

Finals

References

Women's team pursuit